Memduh Oğuz (born 1948) is a Turkish retired bureaucrat who served as the 45th Governor of Isparta between 2010 and 2013, the 36th Governor of Kırklareli between 1999 and 2000, the 29th Governor of Kocaeli between 1996 and 1999, the 37th Governor of Tekirdağ between 1991 and 1992 and as the 36th Governor of Burdur between 1988 and 1991. He is a former Kaymakam (district governor).
He completed the Governors’ Liaison Program in the U.S. by the National Governors’ Association in 1989.
Suleyman Demirel University awarded him an honorary doctorate degree in 2013.

Early life
Memduh Oğuz was born in 1948 in Nevşehir, Cappadocia. He has two brothers, Prof. Aytekin Oguz,MD and Gultekin Oguz. After high school education in Nevsehir High School, he graduated from Istanbul University School of Law. He began working in the civil service as a candidate to become a Kaymakam (district governor) in 1970. He married Canan Oguz in 1973. He has two sons, Fatih Oguz,Esq. and Guven Oguz.

Career

Civil service
Oğuz served as the Kaymakam of the districts of Avanos, Çayeli, Afşin, Derinkuyu, Dicle and Hayrabolu before being appointed as the 36th Governor of Burdur in 1988. He served until 1991, after which he served as the 37th Governor of Tekirdağ between 1991 and 1992, the 29th Governor of Kocaeli between 1996 and 1999, the 36th Governor of Kırklareli between 1999 and 2000 and finally as the 45th Governor of Isparta between 2010 and 2013. He subsequently retired from the civil service.

Political career
Oğuz briefly served as the Mayor of Hayrabolu for two years during 1980-1982.

See also
Governor (Turkey)
List of Turkish civil servants
Ministry of the Interior (Turkey)

References

External links
Website of the Governor of Isparta
Website of the Governor of Kırklareli
Website of the Governor of Kocaeli
Website of the Governor of Tekirdağ
Website of the Governor of Burdur

1948 births
People from Nevşehir
Turkish civil servants
Turkish politicians
Living people
Istanbul University Faculty of Law alumni